John Tembey (11 September 1936 – 29 July 1994) was an English professional rugby league footballer who played in the 1960s.

Background
John Tembey's birth was registered in Whitehaven district (Kells), Cumberland, England, and he died aged 57.

Playing career

International honours
John Tembey won caps for Great Britain while at St. Helens in 1963 against Australia, and in 1964 against France.

County honours
John Tembey represented Cumberland.

County Cup Final appearances
John Tembey played left-, i.e. number 11, in St. Helens' 7-4 victory over Swinton in the 1962 Lancashire County Cup Final during the 1962–63 season at Central Park, Wigan on Saturday 27 October 1962, played left-, i.e. number 8, in the 15-4 victory over Leigh in the 1963 Lancashire County Cup Final during the 1963–64 season at Station Road, Swinton on Saturday 26 October 1963, and played left- in the 12-4 victory over Swinton in the 1964 Lancashire County Cup Final during the 1964–65 season at Central Park, Wigan on Saturday 24 October 1964.

Notable tour matches
John Tembey played left-, i.e. number 4, and scored a try in Whitehaven's 14-11 victory over Australia in the 1956–57 Kangaroo tour of Great Britain and France match at the Recreation Ground, Whitehaven on Saturday 20 October 1956, in front of a crowd of 10,917.

Honoured at Whitehaven
John Tembey is a Whitehaven Hall of Fame Inductee.

References

External links
!Great Britain Statistics at englandrl.co.uk (statistics currently missing due to not having appeared for both Great Britain, and England)
Profile at saints.org.uk
Statistics at wolvesplayers.thisiswarrington.co.uk

1936 births
1994 deaths
Cumberland rugby league team players
English rugby league players
Great Britain national rugby league team players
Place of death missing
Rugby league props
Rugby league second-rows
Rugby league players from Whitehaven
St Helens R.F.C. players
Warrington Wolves players
Whitehaven R.L.F.C. players